Ronald Kinnoch (1910–1994) was a British screenwriter and film producer. Among other films, he produced Escape Route (1952) with George Raft in the lead. Kinnoch also directed the 1958 film The Secret Man (1958).

Selected filmography

Producer
 Melody of My Heart (1936)
 Escape Route (1952)
 Private Information (1952)
 Burnt Evidence (1954)
 The Secret Man (1958)
 Village of the Damned (1960)
 Confessions of a Counterspy (1960)
 Invasion Quartet (1961)
 Postman's Knock (1962)
 Cairo (1963)
 The Ipcress File (1965)

Production Manager
 Beware of Pity (1946)
 Hungry Hill (1947)
 Anna Karenina (1948)
 The Winslow Boy (1948)
 Britannia Mews (1949)
 You Can't Sleep Here (1949)
 Night and the City (1950)
 The Wonder Kid (1951)
 The Long Dark Hall (1951)
 Grip of the Strangler (1958)
 Fiend Without a Face (1958)

Director
 The Secret Man (1958)

References

Bibliography
 Aaker, Everett. George Raft: The Films. McFarland, 2013.

External links

1910 births
1994 deaths
People from Dundee
British film directors
British male screenwriters
British film producers
Writers from Dundee
20th-century British screenwriters
British expatriates in the United States